This is a list of notable Chewa people, a Bantu people of central and southern Africa.

Athletes
 Billy Mutale
 Ernest Mbewe
 Gamphani Lungu
 Patson Daka
 Chimango Kayira
 Christopher Katongo
 Felix Katongo
 Jacob Mulenga
 Kieran Ngwenya
 Davies Phiri
 Webster Muzaza
 Kåre Becker

Others
 Hastings Kamuzu Banda
 Rupiah Bwezani Banda
 Joyce Banda
 Isabel Apawo Phiri
Chewa

Chewa